Nicole Gamble (born June 21, 1977) is a retired American triple jumper.

She competed at the 1994 World Junior Championships, the 1996 World Junior Championships and the 2000 Summer Olympics without reaching the final. Her personal best jump was 14.05 meters, achieved indoors in March 1999 in Indianapolis.

Gamble was born in Sumter, South Carolina.

References

1977 births
Living people
Sportspeople from Sumter, South Carolina
Sportspeople from South Carolina
American female triple jumpers
Olympic track and field athletes of the United States
Athletes (track and field) at the 2000 Summer Olympics
21st-century American women